The Mount Vernon Memorial Highway may refer to:

 George Washington Memorial Parkway, formerly known as the Mount Vernon Memorial Highway
 Virginia State Route 235, currently known as the Mount Vernon Memorial Highway